Luke Eve (born 1974) is an Australian screen director and producer. Originally a freelance photographer, he transitioned into directing music videos and commercials before moving into film and television. Eve was the winner of Tropfest 2005 with his film Australian Summer. He was the series director of SEX: An Unnatural History and the 2012 ABC series Great Southern Land. In 2014, he created, produced, and directed the ground-breaking, critically acclaimed series  Low Life, a black comedy about depression starring Henry Nixon and Claire van der Boom.

In 2017 he directed and produced the follow up series, High Life  which was Executive Produced by Stephen Fry and stars Odessa Young with music by Sarah Blasko. The series has won over 30 major awards  including Best Digital Original at C21 Content London and was also nominated for an AACTA Award. During the 2020 pandemic Luke created, produced, directed and acted in one of the world's first multi-national lockdown series, CANCELLED. The series produced in Australia, Spain and Argentina launched on Facebook Watch and has had over 2 million views. In September 2020 Luke released his feature film debut I Met A Girl, starring Brenton Thwaites and Lily Sullivan in the United States. The film will have its World Premiere Screening at the 25th Busan International Film Festival.

Early life
Born in Sydney, Australia, Eve was raised on a farm in Sydney's outer west. After graduating from high school, he started several degrees before moving to the UK, where he spent four years backpacking around Europe and the rest of the world. During this time he developed a love for photography. Returning to Australia in 1999, he completed a Visual Communications Degree specialising in Photography and Design followed by a Master of Arts from the Australian Film, Television and Radio School, finishing his degree with an internship in New York City for This is That Productions in 2005.

Career
Eve began his career as a freelance photographer working with many unsigned Sydney bands in the early 2000s. He used his work as a springboard to launch into directing music videos. Shortly after he began directing, he launched his own production company, More Sauce. Eve went on to direct dozens of music videos for Australian bands, including Faker, Damien Leith, Small Mercies, Cosima De Vito, and Nikki Webster. He was nominated for an IF Award for his multiple-award-winning music video for The Hot Lies' Emergency! Emergency!

In 2005, Eve won Tropfest with his third short film, Australian Summer.

In 2009, Eve directed his fourth short film, Man’s Best Friend. He also directed his first television series, Dave in the Life, for CJZ Productions and SBS Television Australia.

The following year, Eve directed and produced Cockroach, a 14-minute visual-effects-loaded short film starring Damon Gameau that has gone on to screen at over 30 international film festivals and won over a dozen awards.

In 2011, Eve completed work on his second TV series for SBS, SEX: An Unnatural History, produced by Matchbox Pictures and hosted by Julia Zemiro.

In 2012, Eve was the series director of the landmark documentary series Great Southern Land for ABC Television and CJZ Productions. The production garnered Eve an ADG nomination for Best Direction in a Documentary Series.

Eve began production on his acclaimed web series, Low Life, a six-part black comedy series about depression, in 2013. It received a number of online awards, including the Grand Jury Prize at Melbourne Web Fest and Best Direction at the Australian Online Video Awards.

In 2014, Eve directed two episodes of Julia Zemiro's Home Delivery for CJZ Productions and ABC Television. Production took place in Wales and England.

In 2017 Eve directed and produced the follow up /companion series to Low Life, High Life which was Executive Produced by Stephen Fry and stars Odessa Young with music by Sarah Blasko. The series has won over 30 major awards including Best Digital Original at C21 Content London, best Drama at the Berlin Web Festival and was also nominated for an AACTA Award. The series has sold to BBC3, Channel 9, CanalPlay and Fullscreen.

In 2019 Eve completed production on his debut feature film, I Met A Girl, starring Brenton Thwaites and Lily Sullivan in the United States. The film will have its World Premiere Screening at the 25th Busan International Film Festival in October 2020 followed by a worldwide release.

In 2020, during the pandemic Luke, alongside María Albiñana, co-created, co-produced, directed and acted in one of the world's first multi-national lockdown series, CANCELLED. The series produced in Australia, Spain and Argentina launched on Facebook Watch and has had over 2 million views.

Personal life
Eve splits his time between Los Angeles and Sydney.

He is a passionate advocate of mental health awareness.

Filmography
Film

	
TV

References

Living people
Australian film directors
Australian Film Television and Radio School alumni
1974 births